Martin Jančula (born 26 February 1975) is a former Slovak footballer who played as a midfielder.

South China
Jančula was signed by South China from ŠK Slovan Bratislava. On 29 November 2001, during an Asian Cup Winners' Cup match, he scored a hat-trick against Japanese side Shimizu S-Pulse, with his goals coming in the 9th, 54th and 59th minutes, as he sent a crowd of 10,343 spectators into raptures with a fine display.

Instant-Dict
In the 2000-2001 season, Jančula helped Instant-Dict to an FA Cup victory.

Personal life
His wife Katarína is a model.

References

Living people
Hong Kong First Division League players
ŠK Slovan Bratislava players
South China AA players
Association football midfielders
Slovak footballers
1975 births